Yoram Ben-Porat (also, Ben-Porath; Hebrew: יורם בן-פורת; born 1937; died October 18, 1992) was an Israeli academic and economist. He served as president of the Hebrew University of Jerusalem from 1990 until his death in 1992 in an automobile accident at the age of 55.

Biography
Ben-Porat was born in Ramat Gan, Israel.

He was an economist. Ben-Porat specialized in the problems of the Israeli economy.

Ben-Porat obtained both a bachelor's degree and a master's degrees at the Hebrew University of Jerusalem. He then obtained a Ph.D. at Harvard University in 1967, studying with Simon Kuznets.

He became a member of the Hebrew University of Jerusalem Department of Economics faculty in 1967, where he was the William Haber Professor of Economics. In 1987, Ben-Porat became Rector of the university. 

Ben-Porat was the president of the Hebrew University of Jerusalem from 1990 to 1992, following Amnon Pazy and succeeded by Hanoch Gutfreund.

He was also President of the Israel Economic Association, Director of the Maurice Falk Institute for Economic Research in Israel from 1979–84, and a consultant to the Rand Corporation.

He died on October 18, 1992, in an automobile accident in Eilat, Israel, at the age of 55, along with his 42-year-old wife Dr. Yael Cohen Ben-Porath (a lecturer in logic in the Hebrew University of Jerusalem Philosophy Department) and their five-year-old son, Yahali. They were buried at the Har Hamenuhot cemetery in Jerusalem.

He was succeeded as President of the university by Hanoch Gutfreund.

References 

Academic staff of the Hebrew University of Jerusalem
Hebrew University of Jerusalem alumni
Israeli economists
20th-century Israeli educators
Harvard Graduate School of Arts and Sciences alumni
Presidents of universities in Israel
1937 births
1992 deaths
Road incident deaths in Israel